Soumitrisha Kundu (born 24 February 2000) is an Indian actress who works in Bengali television industry. She is well known for portraying the female lead Mithai in Mithai.

Career
Kundu is from Barasat, West Bengal. She started her career with the television series E Amar Gurudakshina. She has also featured in a number of shows like Jai Kali Kalkattawali, Aloukik Na Loukik, Kone Bou and now as Mithai in Mithai.

Television

Special Appearances

Mahalaya

Awards

References

External links

Bengali actresses
Bengali television actresses
Actresses from West Bengal
Bengali Hindus
21st-century Bengalis
Actresses in Bengali television
Indian soap opera actresses
Indian actresses
21st-century Indian actresses
Living people
Indian television actresses
2000 births
People from Barasat